Ruth Bosibori Nyangau (also written Ruth Bisibori; born 2 January 1988 in Bosiango) is a Kenyan middle-distance runner who specializes in the 3000 metres steeplechase.

Career
In July 2007 she became the first All-Africa Games champion in the event, as it was staged for the first time. In August the same year she finished fourth at the World Championships in a world junior record time of 9:25.25 minutes. The old record was 9:30.70 and belonged to Melissa Rollison. At the 2008 African Championships in Athletics she finished third.

Bosibori was born in Bosiango village near Kisii. 
She started running in 2003 while at Kebirichi Secondary School. She was recruited by Kenya Police after winning provincial championships in 2007. She is used to competing barefoot.

She won the Most Promising Sportswoman of the Year category at the 2007 Kenyan Sports Personality of the Year awards. She was coached by Dan Muchoki until 2007, after started to be followed by the Italian coach Renato Canova, when went under the management of Gianni Demadonna.

In 2009, she improved her personal best to 9:13.16, winning at the 2009 IAAF World Athletics Final by a margin of seven seconds.

During 2010, she gave birth to her daughter Glory (in September). She wants to come back in the late 2011, looking at Olympic Games 2012 in London.

Achievements

References

External links
Pace Sports Management (Internet Archive)

1988 births
Living people
Kenyan female middle-distance runners
Kenyan female steeplechase runners
Athletes (track and field) at the 2008 Summer Olympics
Olympic athletes of Kenya
African Games gold medalists for Kenya
African Games medalists in athletics (track and field)
Athletes (track and field) at the 2007 All-Africa Games
IAAF World Athletics Final winners